The men's large hill individual ski jumping competition for the 1998 Winter Olympics was held in Hakuba Ski Jumping Stadium. It occurred on 15 February.

Results
The top 30 ranked athletes after the first jump advanced to the second jump.

References

Ski jumping at the 1998 Winter Olympics